Kyauk Sat Yay is a 2009 Burmese drama film, directed by Wyne starring Myint Myat, Soe Myat Thuzar, May Than Nu, Htun Eaindra Bo and Khin Than Nu. Zaw Min (Hanthar Myay) won the Best Editing Award in 2009 Myanmar Motion Picture Academy Awards for this film.

Cast

Main cast
Myint Myat as Myint Myat
Soe Myat Thuzar as Thuzar San
May Than Nu as Kalyar Nyein
Htun Eaindra Bo as Thandar Htwe
Khin Than Nu as Daw Hla Myaing

Guest cast
Yan Aung as Thuzar San's husband
Ye Aung as Thandar Htwe's husband
Moe Pyae Pyae Maung as Mar Mar
Thazin as Thandar Htwe's young life
Nan Su Yati Soe as Kalyar Nyein's young life
Melody as Thuzar San's young life
Sandi Myint Lwin as Kalayar Nyein's daughter

Award

References

2009 films
2000s Burmese-language films
Burmese drama films
Films shot in Myanmar
Films directed by Wyne
2009 drama films